Gorna Lešnica is a village in the municipality of Želino, North Macedonia.

History
According to the 1467-68 Ottoman defter, Gorna Lešnica appears as being inhabited by an Orthodox Christian Albanian population. Due to Slavicisation, some families had a mixed Slav-Albanian anthroponomy - usually a Slavic first name and an Albanian last name or last names with Albanian patronyms and Slavic suffixes. The names are: Pavl-o Arbanas (t. Arnaut); Suka, his brother, Dimitri, son of Dil-çe; Ivan, son of Donçe; Pavl-o, son of Dojço; Niko, son of Pren-çe; Nikolla, son of Miha; Dojç, son of Nikolla (Vlatko); Gjon, his son; Bogdan, son of Vllatko; Stojk-o, son of Dono; Gropan, his son; Pavli, son of Dojç-o; Nikolla, son of Dojç-o; Niko, son of Petrush.

Demographics
As of the 2021 census, Gorna Lešnica had 114 residents with the following ethnic composition:
Albanians 104
Persons for whom data are taken from administrative sources 10

According to the 2002 census, the village had a total of 189 inhabitants. Ethnic groups in the village include:
Albanians 188
Macedonians 1

References

External links

Villages in Želino Municipality
Albanian communities in North Macedonia